TCG Gelibolu is a name used three times for ships of the Turkish Navy:

Ships of the Turkish Navy
Turkish Navy ship names